The Delaware State Hornets men's basketball team is the basketball team that represents Delaware State University in Dover, Delaware, United States. The school's team currently competes in the Mid-Eastern Athletic Conference. They are coached by Stan Waterman, who was hired as head coach in 2021.

Postseason results

NCAA tournament results
The Hornets have appeared in the NCAA tournament one time. Their record is 0–1.

NIT results
The Hornets have appeared in the National Invitation Tournament (NIT) two times. Their combined record is 1–2.

CBI results
The Hornets have appeared in the College Basketball Invitational (CBI) one time. Their record is 0–1.

References

External links
Team website